Haveh may refer to:
 Haveh, Delijan
 Haveh, Saveh